"Cry About It Later" is a song by American singer Katy Perry from her sixth studio album, Smile (2020). It is a mid-tempo break-up pop song written by Perry, Noonie Bao, Sasha Sloan, and the track's producer Oscar Holter. The song gatherned positive reviews from music commntary, with Holter's production being praised. However some critics pointed out how the next album track, "Teary Eyes", is identical in subject matter to "Cry About It Later" – postponement of sorrow in favor of short-term pleasure.

An accompanying animated video was published during the album release, on August 28, 2020. It features Perry playing a role of a  witch who struggles to find love in men until she meets a woman at the end of the video. It was directed by Sykosan and animated by Future Power Station. Brazilian DJ Bruno Martini remixed the song, which also featured vocals from Brazilian singer Luísa Sonza. This version was released on April 23, 2021, accompanied by a Jay Sprogell-directed lyric video.

Background and composition

"Cry About It Later" was written by Perry, Noonie Bao, Sasha Sloan, and song's producer Oscar Holter. The song was completed in early 2018 and it talks about accepting break-up and partying afterwards. It is a mid-tempo pop song written in D minor key. The song starts with the chorus backed-up by a minimalist beat, followed by a drop and Perry's first verse.

Release and promotion

"Cry About It Later" was previewed by Perry during Smile Sunday Zoom live stream on August 9, 2020. It was released the same month, as a second track off Perry's sixth studio album, Smile. The track saw limited airplay tracktion in Australia and Russia. The song was later chosen to be the lead track on the singer's second compilation EP Scorpio SZN, which was issued October 26, 2020. The song was also included in her setlist at the Lazada Super Party in March 2021.

As part of The Smile Video Series, "Cry About It Later" received a visual on August 28, 2020. It has been animated by Future Power Station and directed by Sykosan. It shows a story of a woman who struggles to find a lover. She tries to make up with males, but in the end of the visual she falls in love with a female. Althea Legaspi of Rolling Stone saw it as a "new whimsical spin to the Cinderella story" writing "rather than being the damsel in distress, she embraces female empowerment." Billboards Heran Mamo sees also a Dracula reference in the visual, with their conclusion on the video being "singer flips the script by shedding the damsel in distress trope to become the female heroine whose love interests follow no heteronormative happy endings."

Luísa Sonza and Bruno Martini remix
On April 20, 2021 a potential collaboration between Perry and Luísa Sonza was hinted by the latter on Twitter, where she quoted the former's "I Kissed a Girl" title line. The remix of "Cry About It Later" was officially announced two days later featuring addition production from Bruno Martini and was set to be released on April 23, 2021. A lyric video for the remix was uploaded to Perry's YouTube channel on the same day and was directed by Jay Sprogell.

Sonza sings in English in this song's rendition, since both her and Martini came to the conclusion that they "chose to keep it in English," since "it is the language that the world speaks." It is second remix of the song of Perry's fifth studio album Smile featuring a Latin singer, following "Resilient," and it is second collaboration between Sonza and Martini. Talking about the remix, Bruno Martini said "It is hardly a remix. It sounds like another song, it has a completely different footprint than the original. It's really heavy, I'm excited to play it live soon."

Critical reception
Emily Mackay of The Guardian called "Cry About It Later" "cool and sultry," however later she added that with "Teary Eyes" both songs feel "forgettable and anonymous." The New York Timess Lindsay Zoladz paired "Cry About It Later" with "Teary Eyes" and wrote about them that "there are also two consecutive songs about the well-worn pop tableau of crying on the dance floor," also calling latter song better offering than the first one. Among many other songs, Craig Jenkins from Vulture criticised the track since it "sell motivational boilerplate, waving away passing clouds but never describing what the storm felt like."

Nick Malone from PopMatters magazine compared the song to work of Tove Lo and Robyn saying it is "surprisingly dark, claustrophobic thriller about dancing one’s troubles away — but its distance from an essential Katy-Perry-ness gives it an odd fit." The Irish Timess Louise Bruton called it "the grown-up version of 2011's partially problematic "Last Friday Night (T.G.I.F.)"," which "instead of having so much fun that she blacks out, she channels the coldness of boozing to forget." Chris Deville from Stereogum said that the track "bobs and thumps like a scrawnier Imagine Dragons." Commenting on Oscar Holter's production, Alexa Camp of Slant Magazine said "the same rollicking freneticism he and Max Martin brought to the Weeknd's "Blinding Lights"."

Writing for Insider Callie Ahlgrim stated that they like the song, later adding "the song does try a little too hard to be anthemic, but I don't see myself pressing "next" if it were to come on shuffle at a party," when Courtney Larocca called the track "derivative" since "the isolation of Perry's voice, followed by a beat drop at the start of the song is a trick as old as EDM." She also added that "Cry About It Later" "doesn't elicit any sort of emotional response," explaining that "a true crying-in-the-club anthem revels in its devastation without being overtly explicit about it; the weight of the lyrics are meant to cause a pulsing ache in your chest as the production swells to a climax."

Andrea Dresdale from ABC News Radio talking about release of the song within Scorpio SZN EP said that "it's not spooky, but it is about partying all night, with angel wings and a devil's grin." Helen Brown of The Independent called the song "echoey meanderballad." Idolators Mike Wass called the song "slinky bop," while calling Oscar Holter's synths "'80-s evoking." He also included "Cry About It Later" in his list of songs that should have been singles from 2020.

Track listing
Digital download / streaming
 "Cry About It Later" (feat. Luísa Sonza and Bruno Martini) [Luísa Sonza and Bruno Martini remix] 2:39

Credits and personnel
Credits adapted from Tidal.

 Katy Perry vocals, backing vocals, songwriting
 Luísa Sonza vocals, featured artist
 Bruno Martini remixer, featured artist, programming, studio personnel
 Oscar Holter songwriting, production, bass guitar, drums, keyboards, programming
 Noonie Bao backing vocals, songwriting
 Sasha Sloan backing vocals, songwriting
 Peter Karlsson vocal production
 Rickard Goransson guitar
 Cory Bice engineering, studio personnel
 Jeremy Lertola engineering, studio personnel
 Sam Holland engineering, studio personnel
 John Hanes mixing engineering, studio personnel
 Serban Ghenea mixing, studio personnel
 Dave Kutch mastering, studio personnel
 Chris Anokute A&R
 Lauren Glucksman A&R

Charts

Release history

Footnotes

References

2020 songs
Capitol Records singles
Katy Perry songs
Songs written by Katy Perry
Songs written by Oscar Holter
Songs written by Noonie Bao
Songs written by Sasha Alex Sloan